Banff Bay is a coastal embayment in Scotland situated between the towns of Banff, Aberdeenshire and Macduff, Aberdeenshire. The Burn of Myrehouse is one of the streams draining to Banff Bay. Banff Bay is a prominent geographical feature along the northern coast of Aberdeenshire, and it is visible from a number of locations along the coastal plain such as Longman Hill situated somewhat distant to the east.

Notes

References
 United Kingdom Ordnance Survey Map (2004) 1:50,000 scale, Landranger series 
 C. Michael Hogan (2008) Longman Hill, The Modern Antiquarian

See also

 Foudland Hills

Banff, Aberdeenshire
Bays of Aberdeenshire